Marble Mountain-Trout Creek Hill volcanic field (MMTC) is a volcanic field located in Washington, US.

Notable Vents

Trout Creek Hill
Trout Creek Hill is a small Pleistocene basaltic shield volcano in Washington, United States.

West Crater
West Crater is a small andesitic lava dome with associated lava flows in southern Washington.

See also
 List of volcanoes in the United States

References

Cascade Volcanoes
Lava domes
Pleistocene shield volcanoes
Volcanoes of Skamania County, Washington
Volcanic fields of Washington (state)
Volcanoes of Washington (state)
Gifford Pinchot National Forest